The 1980 Major League Baseball strike occurred from April 1 to April 8. The strike caused the final eight days of spring training to be canceled, but did not impact the regular season schedule.

See also
 1980 Major League Baseball season

References

Further reading
 

Major League Baseball strike, 1980
strike
Major League Baseball labor disputes